Eupithecia aliena is a moth in the family Geometridae. It is found in Russia (Dagestan).

References

Moths described in 1982
aliena
Moths of Europe